Paulo Henrique Paes Landim (14 May 1938 – 16 October 2022) was a Brazilian doctor and politician. A member of the Liberal Front Party and later the Brazilian Labour Party, he served in the Legislative Assembly of Piauí from 1991 to 2007.

Paes died in Teresina on 16 October 2022, at the age of 84.

References

1938 births
2022 deaths
Democrats (Brazil) politicians
Brazilian Labour Party (current) politicians
Members of the Legislative Assembly of Piauí